Trafford is a town in Jefferson County, Alabama, United States. A small portion extends into Blount County. The town was incorporated in 1948. At the 2020 census, the population was 613.

Geography
Trafford is located in northern Jefferson County at  (33.818957, -86.746581). The Locust Fork of the Black Warrior River flows through the northwest part of town. The town of County Line borders the town to the east.

Demographics

At the 2000 census there were 523 people, 220 households, and 159 families in the town. The racial makeup of the town was 98.47% White, 0.96% Black or African American, 0.19% from other races, 0.38% from two or more races  and 0.19% of the population were Hispanic or Latino of any race.
Of the 220 households 25.5% had children under the age of 18 living with them, 52.7% were married couples living together, 15.0% had a female householder with no husband present, and 27.7% were non-families. 25.5% of households were one person and 12.7% were one person aged 65 or older. The average household size was 2.38 and the average family size was 2.82.

The age distribution was 20.7% under the age of 18, 10.5% from 18 to 24, 27.2% from 25 to 44, 26.8% from 45 to 64, and 14.9% 65 or older. The median age was 40 years. For every 100 females, there were 90.2 males. For every 100 females age 18 and over, there were 86.1 males.

The median household income was $23,611 and the median family income  was $32,292. Males had a median income of $29,375 versus $18,750 for females. The per capita income for the town was $11,926. About 17.0% of families and 21.3% of the population were below the poverty line, including 34.9% of those under age 18 and 22.0% of those age 65 or over.

References

Towns in Jefferson County, Alabama
Towns in Blount County, Alabama
Towns in Alabama
Birmingham metropolitan area, Alabama